CA 242 can refer to:
 California State Route 242
 CA 242 (tumor marker)